Kurokawa (written: 黒川 or 黒河 lit. "black river") is a Japanese surname. Notable people with the surname include:

, Japanese footballer
, an alias used by Shōji Kawamori (born 1960), Japanese anime producer
, Japanese ice hockey player
, Japanese footballer
, Japanese architect
, Japanese actress and singer
Mitsuya Kurokawa (黒川照家, 1951–2020), Japanese guitarist
, Japanese voice actress
 Nobushige Kurokawa (born 1952), Japanese mathematician
 Suizan Kurokawa (1882-1944), Japanese photographer
 Syo Kurokawa (1926-2010), Japanese lichenologist (Acharius Medal recipient)
 Takaya Kurokawa (born 1981), Japanese footballer
 Tama Kurokawa (1869-1962), Japanese woman with English title as Lady Arnold
 Tomoka Kurokawa (born 1989), Japanese actress
 Yatarō Kurokawa (1910-1984), Japanese actor

Fictional characters
 Kenichi Kurokawa, a character in Mezzo Forte
 Hana Kurokawa (黒川 花), a character in Reborn! Izana Kurokawa (黒川くろかわイザナ), a character in Tokyo Revengers''

Japanese-language surnames